Jean Boulet (16 November 1920, Brunoy – 13 February 2011, Aix-en-Provence) was a French aviator. In 1957, Boulet was awarded the Aeronautical Medal; in 1983, he became one of the founding members of the French National Air and Space Academy. He died at the age of 90.

Early life
He was born on 16 November 1920 in Brunoy, near Paris, Jean Boulet was a graduate of the Ecole Polytechnique he entered in 1940 and was first hired in 1947 by the SNCASE, which would become Sud Aviation and then later the helicopter division of Aérospatiale.

Career
Having been trained in the United States earlier in his life to become a military pilot with the French Air Force, he was one of the first foreign pilots to fly a helicopter in the United States Air Force. Over the years he would fast become one of the greatest pioneers in the history of rotorcraft flight testing.

Aviation records
Boulet set several rotorcraft records for distance, altitude and speed.

When he reduced power and began to descend, because of the extreme cold, the engine flamed out, and Boulet performed the highest ever, power off, full touch down autorotation, landing with absolutely no power. This high altitude autorotation also set a new world record. Because of his unpowered flight back to the ground, he is also credited with the largest altitude flown with an autogyro.

Publications
L'Histoire de L'hélicoptère, Racontée Par Ses Pionniers, 1907-1956 (Editions France-Empire, 1982) 
History Of The Helicopter: As Told By Its Pioneers, 1907-1956, Claude Dawson (translator) (Editions France-Empire, 1984)

References

1920 births
2011 deaths
École Polytechnique alumni
Flight altitude record holders
French aerospace engineers
French aviation record holders
French test pilots
Recipients of the Aeronautical Medal
Rotorcraft flight record holders
Sud Aviation
Supaéro alumni